Muhammad Aslam Butt (Urdu: محمد اسلم بٹ  ) was a Pakistani politician. He remained mayor of Gujranwala city for three consecutive terms.

Political career 
He was elected mayor of Municipal Corporation Gujranwala from 1980 to 1983,1983 to 1987, then from 1988 to 1991. He has done tremendous work for the city and its people during his tenure. In 1983, he acquired 247 state kanals for the construction of a zoo in the city that wasn't completed due to some officials' mishandling; later, a case was registered against the involved. He is the creator of the international cricket ground known as Jinnah Stadium, Gujranwala, where Record-breaking Indian batsman Sachin Tendulkar made his ODI cricket debut in 1989. He has created many landmarks in the city. The most notable are the Municipal corporation building, Quaid-e-Azam Divisional Public school, Jannat bibi park, Gulshan-e-Iqbal park, Jinnah library, taxi stand and Liaquat park.

His son, Engineer Muhammad Ashraf butt, has been elected as a provincial member assembly of Punjab in bi-elections.

A road in the city named Gurunanakpura was renamed in honour of Mayor Muhammad Aslam Butt by the local government paying tribute to his services in Gujranwala.

Death 
He died in his hometown Gujranwala, at 85, as he was ill for many years.

References 

Pakistani politicians
People from Gujranwala
